Mullett can refer to:
 Alfred B. Mullett, American architect
 Donald Mullett, American educator
 Margaret Mullett, Director of Byzantine Studies at Dumbarton Oaks Research Library and Collection in Washington, D.C
 Mullett Township, Michigan
 Mullett Lake, Michigan

See also 
 Mullet (disambiguation)